Léon Charlier (born 27 October 1902, date of death unknown) was a Belgian wrestler. He competed at the 1928 Summer Olympics and the 1936 Summer Olympics.

References

External links
 

1902 births
Year of death missing
Belgian male sport wrestlers
Olympic wrestlers of Belgium
Wrestlers at the 1928 Summer Olympics
Wrestlers at the 1936 Summer Olympics
Place of birth missing